Tomás Mac Curtain (20 March 1884 – 20 March 1920) was an Irish Sinn Féin politician who served as the Lord Mayor of Cork until he was assassinated by the Royal Irish Constabulary. He was elected in January 1920.

Background
Tomás Mac Curtain was born at Ballyknockane, Mourne Abbey, County Cork, on 20 March 1884, the son of Patrick Curtin, a farmer, and Julia Sheehan. He attended Burnfort National School. In 1897 the family moved to Cork City, where he attended the North Monastery School.

Mac Curtain, as he would later be known, was active in a number of cultural and political movements beginning around the turn of the 20th century. He joined the Blackpool, Cork branch of Conradh na Gaeilge (the Gaelic League), becoming its secretary in 1902. He had interests in music, poetry, history, archaeology and Irish history. He worked in his early career as a clerk, and in his free time taught Irish. In 1911 he joined Fianna Éireann, and was a member of the Irish Volunteers.

He met Elizabeth Walsh (Eibhlís Breathnach) at a Gaelic League meeting and they married on 28 June 1908. They had six children, five of whom survived into adulthood. The family lived over number 40 Thomas Davis Street, where Mac Curtain ran a small clothing and rainwear factory.

Easter Rising and military career
In April 1916, at the outset of the Easter Rising, Mac Curtain commanded a force of up to 1,000 men of the Irish Volunteers who assembled at various locations around Co. Cork. From the volunteer headquarters at Sheares Street in the city, Mac Curtain and his officers awaited orders from the volunteer leadership in Dublin. Conflicting instructions and confusion prevailed and, as a result, the Cork volunteers never entered the fray. A tense stand-off developed when British forces surrounded the volunteer hall and it continued for a week until an agreement negotiated with Captain F. W. Dickie, aide-de-camp to  Brigadier General W. F. H. Stafford, the General Officer Commanding (GOC) in Cork, led to the surrender of the volunteers' arms to the then Lord Mayor of Cork, Thomas C. Butterfield, on the understanding that they would be returned at a later date. This did not happen, however, and Mac Curtain was jailed in Wakefield, in the former Frongoch Prisoner of War camp in Wales and in Reading.

After the general amnesty of participants in the Rising 18 months later, Mac Curtain returned to active duty a local commandant of what was now the Irish Republican Army in Co. Cork.

In early 1919 GHQ carried out a radical restructuring by creating three brigades with set boundaries. Frank Hynes' battalion was an example of a whole unit being dissolved to be divided into smaller ranks, as two staffs were elected. During the Conscription Crisis in autumn 1918, Mac Curtain actively encouraged the hiring of the women of Cumann na mBan to cater for Volunteers. He was personally involved with The Squad that, with a Cork battalion, attempted to assassinate Lord French, whose car was missed as the convoy passed through the ambush positions. He remained brigadier of No. 1 Cork when he became Lord Mayor of Cork. He was elected in the January 1920 council elections as the Sinn Féin councillor for NW Ward No. 3 of Cork and was chosen by his fellow councillors to be lord mayor. He began a process of political reform within the city.

Assassination
On 20 March 1920, his 36th birthday, Mac Curtain was shot dead, in front of his wife and son, by a group of men with blackened faces, who were found, by the official inquest into the event, to be members of the Royal Irish Constabulary (RIC). In the wake of the killing, Mac Curtain's house in Blackpool was ransacked.

The killing caused widespread public outrage. The coroner's inquest passed a verdict of wilful murder against British Prime Minister Lloyd George and against certain members of the RIC. Michael Collins later ordered his squad of assassins to uncover and assassinate the police officers involved in the attack. On 22 August 1920, RIC District Inspector Oswald Swanzy, who had ordered the attack, was fatally shot with Mac Curtain's own revolver, while leaving a Protestant church in Lisburn, County Antrim, sparking what was described by Tim Pat Coogan as a "pogrom" against the Catholic residents of the town. Mac Curtain is buried in St. Finbarr's Cemetery, Cork.

His successor to the position of Lord Mayor, Terence MacSwiney, died while on hunger strike in Brixton prison, London.

MacCurtain Street in the centre of Cork City is named after him.

Tomás Óg Mac Curtain
Mac Curtain's son, Tomás Óg (junior) (1915–1994), later became a leading republican and member of the IRA Executive, the main purpose of which was to elect the Chief of Staff of the IRA. In 1935, while armed, he was arrested by an unarmed Garda Síochána Patrick Malone, who received the Silver Scott Medal for bravery. In 1940, Tomás Óg was sentenced to death for shooting Garda Síochána Detective John Roche, who subsequently died. However, he was granted clemency and released after seven years. He later served on the IRA Executive during the Border Campaign.

References

Bibliography
 Fitzpatrick, David, Harry Boland's Irish Revolution (Cork 2003)
 Harrington, Michael, The Munster Republic: The Civil War in North Cork (Cork 2009)
 Irish Labour and  Trade Union Congress, Who burnt Cork City? A Tale of Arson, Loot and Murder: The Evidence of over seventy Witnesses (Dublin 1921)

1884 births
1920 deaths
Assassinated Irish politicians
Assassinated mayors
Deaths by firearm in Ireland
Irish Republicans killed during the Irish War of Independence
Early Sinn Féin politicians
Lord Mayors of Cork
People murdered in Ireland
Police misconduct during the Irish War of Independence
1920s murders in Ireland
1920 murders in Europe
1920 crimes in Ireland
People educated at North Monastery